Craterispermum is a genus of flowering plants in the family Rubiaceae. It contains 16 species that occur in tropical Africa and Seychelles. It is the only genus in the tribe Craterispermeae, of which the divergence time is estimated at 34.8 million years ago.

Species
The following species are recognized as of May 2014:

 Craterispermum angustifolium De Wild. & T.Durand - Zaïre (Congo-Kinshasa, Democratic Republic of the Congo)
 Craterispermum aristatum Wernham - Nigeria, Cameroon
 Craterispermum caudatum Hutch. -Ghana, Côte d'Ivoire, Liberia, Nigeria, Senegal, Sierra Leone, Gabon, Cameroon
 Craterispermum cerinanthum Hiern - Benin, Ghana, Côte d'Ivoire, Nigeria, Togo, Central African Republic, Cameroon, Congo-Brazzaville, Gabon, Zaire, Angola 
 Craterispermum congolanum De Wild. & T.Durand - Zaïre (Congo-Kinshasa, Democratic Republic of the Congo)
 Craterispermum dewevrei De Wild. & T.Durand - Gabon, Zaïre (Congo-Kinshasa, Democratic Republic of the Congo)
 Craterispermum goossensii De Wild. - Zaïre (Congo-Kinshasa, Democratic Republic of the Congo)
 Craterispermum grumileoides K.Schum. - Angola
 Craterispermum inquisitorium Wernham - Gabon, Cabinda, Zaïre (Congo-Kinshasa, Democratic Republic of the Congo)
 Craterispermum laurinum (Poir.) Benth. - Gambia, Ghana, Guinea-Bissau, Guinea, Côte d'Ivoire, Mali, Nigeria, Senegal, Sierra Leone, Central African Republic, Congo-Brazzaville, Gabon 
 Craterispermum ledermannii K.Krause - Cameroon, Gabon, Equatorial Guinea
 Craterispermum longipedunculatum Verdc. - Tanzania 
 Craterispermum microdon Baker - Seychelles
 Craterispermum montanum Hiern - Gulf of Guinea Islands
Craterispermum parvifolium Taedoumg & Sonké  - Cameroon, Gabon, Equatorial Guinea
 Craterispermum reticulatum De Wild. - Zaïre (Congo-Kinshasa, Democratic Republic of the Congo)
Craterispermum robbrechtianum Taedoumg & Sonké - Cameroon, Gabon
 Craterispermum schweinfurthii Hiern - Nigeria, Burundi, Central African Republic, Gabon, Zaïre (Congo-Kinshasa, Democratic Republic of the Congo), Ethiopia, Sudan, Kenya, Tanzania, Uganda, Angola, Malawi, Mozambique, Zambia, Zimbabwe

References

External links 
Craterispermum in the World Checklist of Rubiaceae

Rubiaceae genera
Craterispermeae
Flora of Africa
Flora of Seychelles